Colombia–South Korea relations are the bilateral relations between Colombia and South Korea. Colombian troops arrived in Korea in 1951 as part of UN Forces, but direct diplomatic relations were not established until March 1962.

History

During the Korean War, Colombia was the only Latin American nation to actively participate in the UN Forces, with ground troops and its only frigate, the Almirante. The first Colombian soldiers arrived in Korea on 8 May 1951 and the last departed on 11 October 1954. In all 4,314 soldiers were deployed. The commander of the forces was general Alberto Ruiz Novoa.

Diplomatic relations
Direct diplomatic relations were established in March 1962.

The Embassy of Colombia in Seoul is the diplomatic mission of the Republic of Colombia to the Republic of Korea; it is headed by the Ambassador of Colombia to South Korea.

The embassy  is currently located in the Jongno district of Seoul, near the Gyeonghuigung, the Gyeongbokgung, the Sejong Center, and the Seoul Museum of History precisely at 1 Jongno 1-ga at the intersection of Sejongno expressway, and it is serviced by the Gwanghwamun subway station.

Located on the 11th floor of the Kyobo Life Insurance Building, the embassy shares its space with the Consulate General of Colombia in Seoul, which is also accredited to the Philippines in matters of consular affairs.

Agreements
On 25 June 2012, Colombia and Korea officially concluded negotiations for a free trade agreement.

See also 
 Foreign relations of Colombia
 Foreign relations of South Korea

References

External links
  

 
Korea, South
Bilateral relations of South Korea